Persborg is a neighbourhood of Malmö, situated in the district of Öster, Malmö Municipality, Skåne County, Sweden.

References

Neighbourhoods of Malmö